Gary Neist (born November 1, 1946 in Albert Lea, Minnesota) is an American former wrestler who competed in the 1972 Summer Olympics.

References

External links
 

1946 births
Living people
Olympic wrestlers of the United States
Wrestlers at the 1972 Summer Olympics
American male sport wrestlers
People from Albert Lea, Minnesota